ZhFC Dnepr Mogilev is a football club from Mogilev, Belarus, the women's team of FC Dnepr Mogilev, and playing in the Belarusian Women's Premier League.

Current squad

References 

Women's football clubs in Belarus